Meghha Vakaria (born 28 August 1984) is an Indian former tennis player.

Vakaria has a career-high singles ranking of 381 by the WTA, achieved on 5 July 2004. She also has a career-high WTA doubles ranking of 383, attained on 19 July 2004. She won two singles and eight doubles titles on the ITF Women's Circuit.

Playing for India Fed Cup team, Vakaria has a win–loss record of 2–0.

ITF finals

Singles (2–9)

Doubles (8–4)

Fed Cup participation

Doubles

ITF Junior finals

Singles (3–3)

Doubles (2–2)

References

External links

1984 births
Living people
Indian female tennis players
Racket sportspeople from Mumbai